The North Fork of Long Island AVA is an American Viticultural Area located in eastern Suffolk County, New York. Authored by winemaker Richard Olsen-Harbich in 1985, it includes the entire North Fork of Long Island and the townships of Riverhead, Shelter Island, and Southold. The local climate is heavily influenced by the presence of Long Island Sound, Peconic Bay, and the Atlantic Ocean. The maritime influences of these bodies of water help to moderate temperature fluctuations and extend the growing season up to a month longer than other regions in New York. The most planted grape varieties in the region are Merlot, Chardonnay, and Cabernet Franc. The hardiness zone is 7a.

References 

American Viticultural Areas
New York (state) wine
Geography of Suffolk County, New York
1988 establishments in New York (state)